John Kitzmiller (December 4, 1913 – February 23, 1965) was an American actor who worked in his native land, as well as Italy and the United Kingdom. Kitzmiller achieved his greatest fame as a popular and versatile actor in Europe, making an estimated forty European films. He was the first black actor to win the Cannes Film Festival Award for Best Actor in 1957 for his role in the Yugoslav (Slovenia) film Valley of Peace. He is best-known for his role as Quarrel in the very first EON-produced James Bond movie Dr. No.

Early life
John Kitzmiller was born in Battle Creek, Michigan, the younger of two children born to John B. and Mary E. Kitzmiller. In high school Kitzmiller was a member of the Chemistry Club, and he later attended the University of Michigan, receiving a bachelor's degree in chemical engineering in 1937.

He was commissioned in the US Army reaching the rank of captain in the Corps of Engineers. He was stationed in Italy in 1943, serving with the 92nd Infantry Division during the Italian campaign of World War II. Both of his parents died during his military service, events which likely influenced his decision to become one of the few black soldiers to remain in Italy after the war.

Acting career

Kitzmiller was discovered in 1946 by Luigi Zampa and Carlo Ponti while playing poker at an officers' club. This chance meeting led to his first acting role, in Zampa and Ponti's film To Live in Peace in 1947. Kitzmiller frequently worked in Italian neorealist films. He made Italy his permanent residence and ultimately starred in more than fifty European films, often portraying characters fighting racism.

He played the leading role of "Jerry" in the film Senza pietà ("Without Pity"), from a screenplay by Federico Fellini, Alberto Lattuada and Tullio Pinelli. He received awards commemorating both his role as an actor and as a soldier. In 1957, he was the first black actor to win a best actor award at the Cannes Film Festival for his role in the Yugoslavian (Slovenian) film Valley of Peace. Kitzmiller is most famous for his role as Quarrel in the 1962 James Bond film Dr. No.

Death
Kitzmiller died in Rome of a liver ailment at the age of 51.

Selected filmography 

 To Live in Peace (1947) – Joe
 Tombolo, paradiso nero (1947) – Jack
 Senza pietà (1948) – Jerry Jackson
 Ti ritroverò (1949) – The MP
 Monastero di Santa Chiara (1949) – Il negro
 The Force of Destiny (1950) – Lo scudiero moro
 Variety Lights (1950) – Trumpet player Johnny
 Wolves Hunt at Night (1952) – the black servant of Miguel
 Massacre in Lace (1952) – Rocky Saddler
 At Sword's Edge (1952)
 Final Pardon (1952)
 Delitto al luna park (1952)
 Legione straniera (1953) – Djalmar
 Frine, Courtesan of Orient (1953) – Nabus, lo schiavo muto
 Canto per te (1953) – Angenore
 Terra straniera (1954)
 Non vogliamo morire (1954) – John – il timoniere
 Quay of Blondes (1954) – Michel
 Desiderio 'e sole (1954) – Domestico di Sirovich
 La peccatrice dell'isola (1954) – Il Pescatore negro
 Il grande addio (1954)
 Acque amare (1954) – Mezzanotte
 Tears of Love (1954)
 Il nostro campione (1955) – Raimondo
 Valley of Peace (1956) – Sgt. Jim
 The Mysteries of Paris (1957) – Lo Squartatore
 A vent'anni è sempre festa (1957) – John Miller
 The Naked Earth (1958) – David
 Slave Women of Corinth (1958) – Tomoro
 Vite perdute (1959) – Luca
 Pensione Edelweiss (1959) – Bougron
 Due selvaggi a corte (1959) – Kato
 Seven in the Sun (1960) – Salvador
 Pirates of the Coast (1960) – Rock
 Revolt of the Mercenaries (1961) – Tago
 Totòtruffa 62 (1961) – Ambasciatore del Katonga
 La corona di fuoco (1961) – Akim
 Venus Against the Son of Hercules (1962) – Afros
 Il sangue e la sfida (1962)
 El hijo del capitán Blood (1962) – Moses
 Dr. No (1962) – Quarrel
 Tiger of the Seven Seas (1962) – Serpente
 Cave of the Living Dead (1964) – John – Black Servant
 Indios a Nord-Ovest (1964)
 Il ribelle di Castelmonte (1964) – Ali
 Uncle Tom's Cabin (1965) – Uncle Tom (final film role)

References

External links

 

1913 births
1965 deaths
African-American United States Army personnel
Cannes Film Festival Award for Best Actor winners
Deaths from liver disease
American male film actors
People from Battle Creek, Michigan
Male actors from Michigan
Military personnel from Michigan
United States Army personnel of World War II
African-American male actors
20th-century American male actors
American expatriates in Italy
University of Michigan alumni
United States Army officers
United States Army Corps of Engineers personnel
20th-century African-American people